Griffis-Patton House is a historic plantation house located near Mebane, Alamance County, North Carolina. It was built in 1839–1840, and is a two-story, five bay, brick Greek Revival style house. The front facade features a single story entrance porch with four original, rounded brick columns.  Also on the property are the contributing one-story frame kitchen, a small one-story well house, and a small one-story frame shed roof chicken house, now used as a wood shed.

It was added to the National Register of Historic Places in 1983.

References

Plantation houses in North Carolina
Houses on the National Register of Historic Places in North Carolina
Greek Revival houses in North Carolina
Houses completed in 1840
Houses in Alamance County, North Carolina
National Register of Historic Places in Alamance County, North Carolina